Pitas is a state constituency in Sabah, Malaysia, that is represented in the Sabah State Legislative Assembly.

History

Polling districts 
According to the gazette issued on 24 September 2019, the Pitas constituency has a total of 10 polling districts.

Representation history

Demographics

Election results

References 

Sabah state constituencies